The 1920 Edinburgh South by-election was held on 9 April 1920.  The by-election was held due to the incumbent Coalition Conservative MP, Charles Murray, being appointed Solicitor General for Scotland.  It was retained by Murray.

References

Edinburgh South by-election
Edinburgh South by-election
1920s elections in Scotland
1920s in Edinburgh
Edinburgh South by-election
South, 1920
Ministerial by-elections to the Parliament of the United Kingdom